Jacob Hendrik "Jack" Achilles (born 6 February 1943) is a Dutch shooter. He competed in the 1984 Summer Olympics.

References

1943 births
Living people
Shooters at the 1984 Summer Olympics
Dutch male sport shooters
Olympic shooters of the Netherlands
Sportspeople from Haarlem